German submarine U-740 was a Type VIIC U-boat of Nazi Germany's Kriegsmarine built for service during World War II. Her keel was laid down on 26 April 1942 by Schichau-Werke of Danzig. She was commissioned on 27 March 1943 with Oberleutnant zur See Günther Stark in command.

Design
German Type VIIC submarines were preceded by the shorter Type VIIB submarines. U-740 had a displacement of  when at the surface and  while submerged. She had two shafts and two  propellers.

U-740 was fitted with five  torpedo tubes (four fitted at the bow and one at the stern), fourteen torpedoes, one  SK C/35 naval gun, 220 rounds, and two twin  C/30 anti-aircraft guns. The boat had a complement of between forty-four and sixty.

References

Bibliography

External links

German Type VIIC submarines
World War II submarines of Germany
1942 ships
Ships built in Danzig
Ships built by Schichau
Maritime incidents in June 1944